Lake Pleasant is a lake located in the Adirondack Park in New York in the United States.  The lake is in the town of Lake Pleasant in Hamilton County.

The village of Speculator is at its northern tip, and the hamlet of Lake Pleasant, the county seat, is by the western end. NY Route 8 traverses the north side of the lake, and South Shore Road goes around the south part.

Lake Pleasant is linked to Sacandaga Lake by the Sacandaga Outlet, a small stream that passes under Route 8. The Sacandaga River drains Lake Pleasant and flows out the northern end by Speculator.

The lake is ringed with seasonal and year-round houses. A public beach is at the north end in Speculator. Most commercial development is found along Route 8 and adjacent to Speculator, while the area along South Shore Road is primarily residential.

Fishing
Fish species in the lake are smallmouth bass, walleye, yellow perch, rainbow trout, brown trout, rock bass, chain pickerel, sunfish, and black bullhead. There is a state-owned public hand launch on the north shore near the outlet and also a navigable channel from Sacandaga Lake.

References

Lakes of New York (state)
Lakes of Hamilton County, New York